Continuum is a West Palm Beach satellite art fair extension created by ATB Fine Art Group Inc in partnership with Craig Mcinnis Studio  and sponsored by Art Palm Beach Next Level Fairs. Continuum is held each year during Art Palm Beach Week (. Art Palm Beach Week's programming attracts more than 28,000 people to Palm Beach County each year.

Description 

The Continuum fair began on January 22–26, 2014, in the historical Anthony building in downtown West Palm Beach, Florida.  The Continuum was orchestrated by Trina-Slade Burks and Anthony Burks of “ATB Fine Art Group Inc ” in community partnership with Lee Ann Lester of Art Palm Beach Next Level Fairs. 
Continuum is fostering a new exhibition model with community partners, which respond to the demands of the emerging collector eager to know the new values of art, and keen to contribute to a change in the relationships and practices of acquisition of work. The Continuum fair took a unique multi-faceted approach to the exhibition by using music, dance, and poetry to enhance the visual experience of the art . Within the continuing spirit of creative and artistic renewal, the fair featured, top graffiti artist of the area. They created an interactive wooden sculptural mural structure along the Clematis Street corridor in Downtown West Palm Beach. The fair profiled the top artists in the Southeast Florida region. The dynamic fair programming generated a wealth of interest from an increasingly diverse audience base. 

The City of West Palm Beach in which The Continuum fair is located,  has in recent years, experienced a creative renaissance, especially in the visual arts. The area is home to many of the world's top art collectors. The city continues to attract international attention and more newcomers in terms of artists, galleries and curators. In 2014, Art Palm Beach began partnering with the community in order further facilitate the growth of Palm Beach County into an international arts destination.

Exhibitors
 Anthony Burks
 Caron Bowman
 Jay Bellicchi
 David German
 Anthony Hernandez
 JaFleu
 Eduardo Mendieta
 Robert Mcknight
 Craig Mcinnis
 Nzingah Oniwosan
 Elle Schorr

References 

Sjostrom,Jan."ArtPalmBeach adds link to local arts districts for international showcase ", Palm Beach Daily News, South Florida, 21 January 2014.

External links
  Continuum ArtFair
 Art Palm Beach

Art fairs